Lebanon is a Middle-Eastern country on the Mediterranean Sea.

Lebanon may also refer to:

Places

Lebanon
Mount Lebanon
Greater Lebanon

United States
Lebanon, Colorado
Lebanon, Connecticut
Lebanon, Delaware
Lebanon, Georgia
Lebanon, Illinois
Lebanon, Indiana
Lebanon, Kansas
Georgetown, Kentucky or Lebanon
Lebanon, Kentucky
Lebanon National Cemetery
Lebanon, Maine
Lebanon, Missouri
Lebanon, Nebraska
Lebanon, New Hampshire
Lebanon College
Lebanon, New Jersey
Lebanon, New York 
Lebanon (Dunn, North Carolina), a historic plantation house
Lebanon, North Dakota 
Lebanon, Ohio
Lebanon Correctional Institution
Lebanon Raceway
Lebanon, Oklahoma
Lebanon, Oregon
Lebanon, Pennsylvania
Battle of Lebanon, a battle in the American Civil War
Lebanon County, Pennsylvania
Lebanon, South Carolina, a site of a tornado during the Hurricane Frances tornado outbreak
Lebanon, South Dakota
Lebanon, Tennessee
Lebanon, Hardin County, Tennessee
Lebanon, Texas
Lebanon, Virginia
Lebanon, Dodge County, Wisconsin, a town
Lebanon (CDP), Wisconsin, a census-designated place
Lebanon, Waupaca County, Wisconsin, a town

Other uses
Lebanon (film), a 2009 Israeli film
Lebanon (grape) or Catawba grape
Lebanon (painting), a 1983 painting by Nabil Kanso
Lebanon bologna, a type of lunch meat
Lebanon cedar
Lebanon Cemetery
"The Lebanon" (song), a song by The Human League from Hysteria
"Lebanon", a song by Scatman John
The Lebanon pigeon, a breed of domestic pigeon
"Lebanon", the 300th episode of the American dark fantasy television series Supernatural

See also
Lebanon Airport (disambiguation)
Lebanon High School (disambiguation)
Lebanon Township (disambiguation)
Lebanon Valley College, a private college in Annville, Pennsylvania
Mount Lebanon (disambiguation)
New Lebanon (disambiguation)
North Lebanon (disambiguation)
Old Lebanon, Wisconsin, an unincorporated community
South Lebanon (disambiguation)
West Lebanon (disambiguation)